Miss Earth 2008, the 8th edition of the Miss Earth pageant, was held on November 9, 2008, at the Clark Expo Amphitheater  in Angeles City, Philippines. Eighty-five delegates arrived from 19 October 2008 in Philippines. The pageant was broadcast live via ABS-CBN and coverage since on Studio 23 in the Philippines and other stations throughout the world.

Jessica Trisko of Canada crowned her successor Karla Henry of Philippines the end of the event. The pageant was hosted by Billy Crawford, international singer and actor from the film Dominion: Prequel to the Exorcist, Miss Earth 2004 winner Priscilla Meirelles, and Miss Earth Canada 2006 Riza Santos.

Results

Placements

Special awards

Major awards
The following special awards were officially awarded during the grand coronation night:

Minor/Sponsor awards

Order of Announcements

Top 16

Top 8

Top 4

Winning answer
Final Question in Miss Earth 2008: "If you have the chance to speak to the newly-elected US President Barack Obama about the state of the global environment, what would you tell him?"

Answer of Miss Earth 2008: "What I would tell to the newly elected president of the USA, being one of the most powerful countries in the world, I would encourage him to implement environmental knowledge in the curriculum of all schools whether in the United States or in the Philippines. Environmental knowledge is something that all of us must share, but most importantly we must teach the youth that this is something that we should instill in them so that in the near future they will be the ones to take care of our mother Earth." – Karla Henry, represented Philippines.

Pageant

Format
Starting this year, the format of the finale has changed. In previous years, after the swimsuit competition, there will have only eight delegates. They will compete in the first question and answer section with different questions, then participate in the evening gown competition. After that, the top four was announced and participated in the final question. But from this year, the top eights will only participate in the evening gown competition. After that, the judges will select the final four. They only participated in one part of the only question and answer session before announcing three runners-up and Miss Earth.

Judges

Background music
 Opening: Yves Larock – Rise Up, Pussycat Dolls – When I Grow Up
 Swimsuit Competition: Enur feat. Natasha – Calabria
 Evening Gown Competition: Coldplay – Viva la Vida

Preliminary events

Beauties for a Cause
The delegates of Miss Earth 2008 explored the different islands of the Philippines with the theme "Green Lifestyle" and promoted the use of recyclable materials as part of our collective lifestyle. In addition, they engaged on different environmental activities including the planting of trees in the provinces of Albay, Batangas, Pampanga, Pangasinan, Palawan, and Rizal. They also had school tours in Taytay, Rizal, and Metro Manila and taught the children the importance of protecting the environment.

Long gown
Miss Venezuela, Daniela Torrealba was named Best in Long Gown at the competition held at the PAGCOR, Grand Theatre in the city of Parañaque on 3 November 2008.

Swimsuit
On 25 October 2008, the delegates were divided into three groups which simultaneously competed in the swimsuit preliminary competition in three different locations:
 Sabang Beach Resort in Puerto Princesa, Palawan
 Golden Sunset Resort in Calatagan, Batangas
 Manila

The 15 finalists in each group then competed in the Final Swimsuit Competition held on 2 November at the Fontana Leisure Park in the Clark Freeport Zone, Angeles, Pampanga. Abigail Elizalde of Mexico emerged as the winner of the Best in Swimsuit.

National costume
The National Costume competition of Miss Earth 2008 was held on 28 October 2008 at the PAGCOR Grand Theatre in the city of Parañaque. And again minor/sponsor awards were also given at that night.

All of 85 candidates participated in the competition, with Miss Panama winning the coveted Best in National Costume award. Miss Philippines, Karla Henry was unanimously chosen by the members of the press as Miss Photogenic. Minor/sponsor awards were also given at that night.

TV shows
The ladies had their TV guesting on the different shows of ABS-CBN and Studio 23, the official media partner of Carousel Production for Miss Earth 2008. They had gone to Wowowee, ASAP, Kapamilya, Deal or No Deal, and The Singing Bee.

Mall tours
The delegates also had their mall tours and fashion shows in all Robinsons Malls nationwide in order to promote its cause which is to promote the protection of our environment.

Contestants

Notes

Debuts

Returns

Last competed in 2001:
 
Last competed in 2003:
 
 
Last competed in 2005:
 
Last competed in 2006:

Withdrawals

Did not compete
  – Olha Bilousova
  – Miss Tourism Vietnam 2008 Phan Thị Ngọc Diễm was invited by the Elite to participate in the contest and on the official fanpage also posted pictures with her personal information. However, she later said she did not officially participate in the competition. Explaining this, Ms. Nguyễn Thị Thúy Nga - CEO of Elite Company said her profile could not be completed in time to submit to the Ministry of Culture, Sports and Tourism has not found a truly suitable representative. Later, Carousel Productions removed her image and Vietnam officially withdrew from the competition this year.

Other notes
 Harshita Saxena surrendered her Miss India Earth title, paving way for Tanvi Vyas, who became Pantaloons Femina Miss India Earth 2008.
 Debby Gommeren was a replacement of Barbara van den Bussche, the original winner for an unknown reason.
 Akemi Fukumura (Japan) replaced Mayu Kato, the original contestant for unknown reason.
 Karla Paula Henry (Philippines) gained too much weight during her reign, which concerned a lot of pageant fans.

Images

References

External links

 
 Miss Earth Foundation
 Miss Earth Foundation Kids' I Love My Planet

2008
2008 in the Philippines
2008 beauty pageants
Beauty pageants in the Philippines